Seehausen am Staffelsee is a municipality in the district of Garmisch-Partenkirchen, in Bavaria, Germany. The main village, Seehausen, lies on the eastern shore of the Staffelsee lake.

Notable people 

 Bolko von Richthofen (1899–1983) archaeologist, died in Seehausen am Staffelsee
 Karl Michael Vogler (1928–2009) actor, died in Seehausen am Staffelsee

References

Garmisch-Partenkirchen (district)